Goworowo  is a village in the administrative district of Czerwińsk nad Wisłą, within Płońsk County, Masovian Voivodeship, in east-central Poland. Olympian Kazimierz Suchorzewski was born here.

History
During the invasion of Poland, a member of the SS-Artillerie-Standarte and an Army Feldgendarme executed 50 Jews in the village. The local German Army commander ordered a court-martial, with the prosecutor demanding the death penalty. The charges were however dropped following intense pressure from Himmler.

References

Bibliography

 

Villages in Ostrołęka County